The following is a list of diesel-electric locomotives that meet or exceed EPA Tier 2 locomotive emissions regulations, sorted by builder. This is a non-exhaustive list of locomotives in North America. Furthermore, green/clean energy is an always developing sector and that more locomotives may be added to the list, while some will no longer meet current standards.

Altoona Works

Brandt Road-Rail

Brookville Equipment

Electro-Motive Diesel

GE Transportation

Motive Power and Equipment Solutions

MotivePower

National Railway Equipment

Progress Rail

Railpower Technologies

Vehicle Projects

EPA Tier 2-compliant locomotives of the United States
EPA Tier 3-compliant locomotives of the United States
Railway locomotive-related lists